The Headies 2013 was the 8th edition of The Headies. It was held on 26 December 2013, at the Oriental Hotel in Lagos. The show was hosted by Tiwa Savage and Dr SID. Olamide was the biggest awardee of the night, winning three awards from seven nominations. Phyno won the Best Rap Single category for his song "Man of the Year". D'Tunes, Praiz, and Blackmagic all won for the first time. Sean Tizzle won the Next Rated category and was later awarded a Hyundai Tucson. Davido took home two awards, including Best R&B/Pop Album for Omo Baba Olowo. Iyanya only received one award from five nominations. Veteran Fuji artist Wasiu Ayinde Marshall was inducted into the Headies Hall of Fame. 2 Face Idibia, Banky W., Waje, Nikki Laoye, Mode 9, Dr SID and Kcee all went home with a plaque. Harrysong's tribute song to Nelson Mandela, titled "Mandela", won the Most Downloaded Callertune award.

Controversy
Burna Boy reportedly exited the Oriental Hotel after Sean Tizzle was announced as the winner of the Next Rated category. He allegedly told photographers not to take photos of him.

Performers
The following artists performed at the ceremony:

Presenters

Mai Atafo
Stephanie Coker
Yvonne Ekwere
Koch Okoye
Darey Art Alade
Kemi Adetiba 
Chin Okeke
Seyi Law
Lynxxx
Osas Ighodaro

Mercy Omo London
Toolz 
Kelechi Amadi Obi
Funmi Iyanda
Illbliss
Jumoke Awolade-James
Daddy Freeze
Tewa Onasanya
Chris Ihidero

Winners and nominees

References

2013 music awards
2013 in Nigerian music
The Headies